The Lexington County Blowfish are a summer collegiate baseball team in the Coastal Plain League. The team plays its home games at the Lexington County Baseball Stadium in unincorporated Lexington County, South Carolina (with an address in the town of Lexington). The Blowfish first started competing in the CPL during the 2006 season. During their first year in existence, the Blowfish led the Coastal Plain League in attendance and was voted the Coastal Plain League Organization of the Year.

The Blowfish are known for their family-friendly fun at the ballpark and in the community. The organization offers all-you-can-eat ticket plans (including 5-game, 10-game and 15-game options), packaged with the team’s top theme nights and fireworks shows.

Lexington County has been named the Coastal Plain League Organization of the Year three times (2022, 2015, 2006).

The Blowfish announced KC Brown as the team’s head coach prior to the 2023 season.

The front office consists of team Co-owners Bill & Vicki Shanahan and General Manager Tony Baldwin.

The Blowfish replaced the Capital City Bombers when professional baseball left Columbia after the 2004 season. The Blowfish moved from Columbia to Lexington County in 2014. The team is named after popular South Carolina band Hootie and the Blowfish.

Columbia area baseball history
Since 1892 Columbia has fielded teams in various minor leagues, including:
Columbia Senators-1892-South Atlantic League
Columbia Skyscrapers-1904-South Atlantic League
Columbia Gamecocks-1905-1910-South Atlantic League
Columbia Commies-1911-South Atlantic League
Columbia Comers-1912, 1914-1917, 1919-1923, 1925-1930-South Atlantic League
Columbia Sandlappers-1934-Piedmont League
Columbia Senators-1936-1937-South Atlantic League
Columbia Reds-1938-1941, 1946-1954, 1960-1961-South Atlantic League
Columbia Gems-1955-1959-South Atlantic League
Columbia Mets-1983-1992-South Atlantic League
Capital City Bombers-1993-2004-South Atlantic League
Columbia Fireflies- 2016–2020-South Atlantic League, 2021-present-Low-A East

Summer college teams:
 Columbia Blowfish-2006-2014-Coastal Plain League

The Blowfish hosted the 2007 and 2018 Coastal Plain League All-Star Games.

Notable Lexington County baseball alumni

Blowfish alumni
Ten former Blowfish have played Major League Baseball:
Michael Kohn
Ryan Garton
Tyler Webb
C.D. Pelham
Taylor Widener
Wil Crowe
Chas McCormick
Charlie Barnes
JP Sears
Cody Morris

Notable alumni of other teams

Kevin Youkilis (Florence)
Justin Verlander (Wilson)
Ryan Zimmerman (Peninsula)
Mark Reynolds (Fayetteville)
Lou Trivino (Florence)
Alec Bohm (Wilmington)
Russell Wilson (Gastonia)

References

External links
 
 Coastal Plain League

Coastal Plain League
2006 establishments in South Carolina
Baseball teams established in 2006
Amateur baseball teams in South Carolina
Lexington County, South Carolina